The Port of Corabia is one of the largest Romanian river ports, located in the city of Corabia on the Danube River.

References

Ports and harbours of Romania
Corabia